Rolando António Pereira Rocha Almeida (born 13 January 1993) aka Landinho, is a Portuguese footballer who plays for Amora as a midfielder.
.

Football career
On 6 October 2013, Landinho made his professional debut with Portimonense in a 2013–14 Segunda Liga match against Santa Clara replacing Hugo Gomes (63rd minute).

References

External links

Stats and profile at LPFP

1993 births
Living people
People from Amarante, Portugal
Portuguese footballers
Association football midfielders
Liga Portugal 2 players
Segunda Divisão players
Portimonense S.C. players
AD Fafe players
F.C. Felgueiras 1932 players
GD Bragança players
F.C. Vizela players
Amora F.C. players
Sportspeople from Porto District